Guy Chambefort (born 19 October 1944 in Saint-Étienne) was a member of the National Assembly of France. He represented the first constituency of the Allier department, from 2007 to 2017 and sat as a member of the Socialist, Radical, Citizen and Miscellaneous Left group in the Assembly.

References

1944 births
Living people
Politicians from Saint-Étienne
Socialist Party (France) politicians
Deputies of the 13th National Assembly of the French Fifth Republic
Deputies of the 14th National Assembly of the French Fifth Republic